High-Ballin is a 1978 Canadian action comedy film about truckers directed by Peter Carter. The US release was rated PG, with a runtime of 97 minutes.

Plot
Jerry Reed plays the "Iron Duke", an independent trucker who stands up to the local trucker boss, King Carroll, who tries to drive independent truckers out of business through intimidation tactics by a gang led by his partner Harvey. Duke's friend Rane, played by Peter Fonda, comes to visit his friend and ends up helping him. Rane and Pickup suggest hauling a load of illegal liquor to a lumber camp, in order to become secure enough to resist King and Harvey's pressure, and thus inspiring other independents to resist as well.

Duke is shot, and Rane organizes the other truckers to confront King and Harvey. Pickup is kidnapped by Harvey. Back at King's headquarters, Harvey knocks Pickup unconscious, shooting King when he protests. As the truckers arrive and fight King's men, Harvey puts Pickup in his car and drives away. Rane sees Harvey and gives chase. When Harvey stops, he and Rane confront each other in a fight. Both men draw their weapons and Rane shoots Harvey, then embraces Pickup. At the end of the film, Rane drives away in Pickup's truck.

The movie was described as "a modern day western, with trucks instead of horses." Another observer said it could be summarized as "Pow, crash, screw, fight, collide, punch, slam, crash, screw."

While set ostensibly in the United States, the CN Tower appears in the background during the film's climax, and all vehicles carry Ontario plates.

Cast
 Peter Fonda as Rane 
 Jerry Reed as "Iron Duke" Boykin 
 Helen Shaver as "Pickup" 
 Chris Wiggins as "King" Carroll 
 David Ferry as Harvey
 Harvey Atkin as "Buzz"
 Michael Hogan as Reggie
 Michael Ironside as Butch

Myrna Lorrie and Prairie Oyster also perform musical scenes in the film.

Production
The film was Jon Slan's first large-budget venture. During production, the working title was P.F. Flyer, but High-Ballin''' was adopted during the course of filming. Its shooting schedule was 10 weeks, between October and December 1977.

The film was filmed in and around Milton, Ontario, the Toronto waterfront and rural roads north of Toronto, with notable scenes shot at the Fifth Wheel in Milton and a small farmhouse near Kleinburg. In special effects, it featured a "flaming cannon roll" which had not previously been attempted in a motion picture.

Release and receptionHigh-Ballin' was released in Toronto on May 26, 1978, but it was not seen in Los Angeles until August 30. Its television release was on November 28, 1978, when it was seen on CBS.

The Independent Film Journal noted that "although High-Ballin’ is no great shakes in terms of original storytelling, director Peter Carter provides a good deal more polish and flash than one might expect of the raucous road genre." In The Toronto Star, Clyde Gilmour said, "This is a popcorn movie, intended to be half-watched while your mind is toying with other matters." The Motion Picture Product Digest characterized it as an exploitation film, describing it as "[existing] not to provide any kind of realistic picture of the trucking industry today but to exploit it for a standard action movie with lots of violence."The Globe and Mail characterized the film thus:

It has also been released under the title Death Toll'' and was made available in video format in 1989.

Further reading

References

External links
 
 
 
 
 

Canadian action comedy films
English-language Canadian films
Trucker films
1978 films
Films shot in Ontario
American International Pictures films
Films directed by Peter Carter
1970s English-language films
1970s Canadian films